The Clam-Gallas Palace is a Baroque palace in Prague, the capital of the Czech Republic. The building is situated on the corner of Husova Street and Mariánské Square, in Prague Old Town.

History 
The palace was first designed by the imperial court architect Johann Bernhard Fischer von Erlach, from Vienna. It was built in 1714–18 by the Italian architect Domenico Canevale. During the rest of the 18th century, Jewish balls and concerts were held in the palace, and were attended by noteworthy artists including Mozart and Beethoven.

The Clam–Gallas Palace was built for the Viceroy of Naples, Count John Wenceslaus of Gallas. The Gallas family died out in 1757, and at that point the palace was inherited by Kristian Filip of Clam, son of Gallas' sister, which is how the Clam-Gallas family was created.

The palace is now owned by the City of Prague which lends it to the Prague City Archives. Besides, since 2010 a multi-genre festival named "Opera Barocca" is regularly held (twice a year) in the palace premises. This festival is focused on historically informed performance of Baroque music, dance, theatre and carnival.

External links
 Clam-Gallas Palace – a gem of Baroque architecture in Prague – brief tourist info
 L'Opera Barocca – official pages of the festival

Palaces in Prague
Old Town (Prague)
Government buildings completed in 1718
Baroque architecture in Prague